Numerous Royal Navy vessels have been named HMS Dolphin after the dolphin.

 The first seven Dolphins were small ketches and fireships.
 , launched in 1731, was a 20-gun post ship, renamed Firebrand in 1755 and Penguin in 1757.
 , launched in 1751, was a 24-gun post ship. She was used as a survey ship from 1764 and made two circumnavigations under the command of John Byron and Samuel Wallis. She was broken up in 1777.
  was a 44-gun fifth rate launched in 1781 and broken up in 1817. 
She became a transport in 1800, a storeship in 1802, and was broken up in 1803.
  was a 10 or 12-gun cutter hired by the Royal Navy in 1793, purchased in 1801, and sold in 1802.
  was the 12-gun American privateer schooner Dolphin captured by Admiral John Borlase Warren's squadron on 13 April 1813. 
  was originally the East Indiaman Admiral Rainier, purchased in 1804 and renamed Hindostan, renamed Dolphin in 1819, and Justitia in 1830. She was used as a convict ship and sold in 1855.
  was a 3-gun brigantine launched in 1836 and sold in 1894.
  was a screw sloop launched in 1882. She served as a submarine depot ship in World War I. She foundered in 1925 but was beached and used as a school ship. She was broken up in 1977.
  was originally the depot ship Pandora, purchased in 1914. She was renamed Dolphin in 1924 and was sunk by a mine in 1939.
 , the spiritual home of the Royal Navy's submarine service at Fort Blockhouse in Gosport, and was a submarine base until 1994 and training school to 1999.

Also
 , a brig-sloop that was formerly the French privateer La Marquise de Cavalaire, captured by HMS Dolphin on 19 September 1747
 In 1803 , anchored in Portsmouth, had a cutter Dolphin that made two captures in company with the privateer Henry.

References
 

Royal Navy ship names